Cynolebias constanciae, also known as the pearlfish or tropical killifish, is a species of fish in the family Aplocheilidae endemic to Brazil. The name "pearlfish" comes from its long fins with elongated rays and the pearl-like markings decorating its body. It can reach sizes of up to  TL  in the wild and can live for about 2 years.

References

Cynolebias
Fish of Brazil
Endemic fauna of Brazil
Taxonomy articles created by Polbot
Taxobox binomials not recognized by IUCN